Varsity Express (Varsity Air Services Ltd) was a regional airline based at London Oxford Airport in England.  It was never a licensed airline, instead it sold tickets on flights operated by Linksair. Varsity Express operated only 11 scheduled flights over the space of one week in March 2010.

History

The airline first became public on 20 January 2010.  Press releases arranged by a British aviation PR company called Emerald Media announced that Varsity Express would launch an air service between Edinburgh and Oxford in March 2010. From the outset, Varsity Express embraced social networking and microblogging media, using Twitter and Facebook to reach out to its potential clientele in the university cities where it planned to operate.  Even before its maiden flight, Varsity Express announced new routes linking Newcastle-upon-Tyne with both Edinburgh and Oxford.

The company was set up and managed by Martin Halstead.  Halstead secured some publicity in 2005 when, at the age of 18, he announced that he would launch his own aviation business. Halstead's 2005 business was called AlphaOne Airways.  It had a number of false starts. Halstead announced services from Oxford in March 2005 and later the same year from Southampton Airport. AlphaOne Airways never flew a single flight from either airport.  In December 2005 and January 2006, a limited flight programme took place between Isle of Man and Edinburgh.  The business folded after having carried only 46 passengers.

Halstead's personality-based PR had underpinned AlphaOne Airways, but the venture was underfunded.  Because AlphaOne did not have the necessary certification to operate flights itself, Halstead arranged for a licensed carrier to fly on his behalf.  He followed the same strategy with Varsity Express, but claimed he had a sounder funding base.

The airline started operations on 1 March 2010 with flight LNQ601 (operated on behalf of Varsity by Linksair) leaving Oxford Airport shortly after 0800 local time, touching down in Edinburgh at 9.42 am.  Operations ceased just one week later.

Demise and Aftermath
On the afternoon of 8 March 2010, Varsity Express suspended operations after Links Air, the company which owned the plane leased by Varsity, refused to continue supporting the airline. A take over of Varsity Express by Linksair had collapsed earlier in the day. Thirteen passengers were left stranded because the second leg of their return tickets was not honoured.

Destinations
For the one week that it operated, Varsity Express linked the following two airports:

United Kingdom
England
Oxford - London Oxford Airport
Scotland
Edinburgh - Edinburgh Airport

Operator Status
Varsity Express did not have an Air Operator's Certificate, so the company's flights were operated by Humberside Airport based Linksair Ltd using a single Jetstream 31 aircraft.  Varsity Express (like AlphaOne Airways before it) was thus an extreme example of what transport economists often term a virtual airline.  It even outsourced its core flying operations.  Because it neither possessed, nor had it applied for, an Air Operator's Certification from the Civil Aviation Authority (United Kingdom), Varsity Express was never subject to the regulatory scrutiny (with respect to financial backing and the sustainability of the proposed operation) that would have applied to a start-up carrier seeking to secure its own Air Operator's Certificate.

Fleet
 BAe Jetstream 31

See also
 List of defunct airlines of the United Kingdom

References

External links
Inaugural flight trip report
Oxford Mail article

Companies based in the London Borough of Tower Hamlets
Defunct airlines of the United Kingdom